Maiden Voyage is an album by pianist Ramsey Lewis which was recorded in 1968 and released on the Cadet label.

Track listing
 "Maiden Voyage" (Herbie Hancock) - 4:45   
 "Mighty Quinn" (Bob Dylan) - 3:10   
 "Sweet Rain" (Mike Gibbs) - 3:00   
 "Lady Madonna" (John Lennon, Paul McCartney) - 2:25   
 "Do You Know the Way to San Jose" (Burt Bacharach, Hal David) - 3:40   
 "Ode" (Charles Stepney) - 4:40   
 "Les Fleur" (Stepney) - 4:35   
 "Since You've Been Gone" (Aretha Franklin, Ted White) - 2:55   
 "In The Heat of the Night" (Quincy Jones) - 3:47   
 "Afro-Boogaloo Twist" (Cleveland Eaton) - 2:30   
 "Only When I'm Dreaming" (Stepney, Alex Dino) - 3:55   
 "Eternal Journey" (Stepney, Ramsey Lewis) - 6:26

Personnel 
Ramsey Lewis - piano
Cleveland Eaton - bass, arranger
Maurice White  - drums
Charles Stepney - arranger

References 

 

1968 albums
Ramsey Lewis albums
Cadet Records albums
Albums arranged by Charles Stepney